Semanga is a genus of butterflies in the family Lycaenidae. The genus was erected by William Lucas Distant in 1884.

Species
Listed alphabetically:
 Semenga helena (Röber, 1887) – Helena rededge - found in Banggai and ?Sulawesi
 Semanga superba (Druce, 1873) - found in Sumatra, Peninsular Malaya, Singapore, Langkawi, Burma, Mergui, Thailand, Pulau Tioman, Sumatra, Thailand and Vietnam

References

Arhopalini
Lycaenidae genera
Taxa named by William Lucas Distant